Hemerobius stigma is a species of brown lacewing in the family Hemerobiidae. It is found in Europe and Northern Asia (excluding China) and North America. The species was introduced to New Zealand to prey on adelgidae growing on pine plantations, and was first noted as being present in the country in 1935, however was not able to be established.

References

Further reading

External links

 

Hemerobiiformia
Articles created by Qbugbot
Insects described in 1836
Insects of Australia